The House of Laanui (Hale O Laanui in the Hawaiian language) is a family of heirs to the throne of the Kingdom of Hawaii collateral to the House of Kamehameha. Both houses are branches of the House of Keōua Nui.

The House of Laanui stems from the High Chief Laanui who was the son of Nuhi, the ruler of Waimea, Hawaii and became the alii nui of Waialua.  He was one of the main chief warriors who went to Kauai to subdue George Prince Kaumualii.  His eldest offspring was a daughter named Elizabeth Kekaaniauokalani Laanui, the youngest, or muli loa was a son named Gideon Kailipalaki-o-Keheananui Laanui. The House of Laanui was continued through these two children after Laanui himself died on 12 September 1849 and buried within the Liliuokalani Church cemetery grounds of his old estate where he ruled.  His daughter Elizabeth Kekaaniau Laanui became the only survivor of the Hawaiian nobility who were eligible to the throne after the death of Liliuokalani, the last queen of Hawaii.  Her brother's child, High Chiefess Owana Kaohelelani Laanui was the only descendant from the House of Laanui to have children and comprise the royal descendants from the house of Keōua nui the progenitor of the Kamehamehas.

Kalokuokamaile 

The eldest branch of the House of Keōua Nui is from descendants of chiefs of the Kona district of the island of Hawaii, and from the island of Maui. The dynastic line was established by Kalokuokamaile who was the eldest half-brother of King Kamehameha I, who established the reigning House of Kamehameha.  Kalokuokamaile was the son of High Chief Keōua Kalanikupuapaikalaninui and High Chiefess Kahikikala-o-kalani of Western Maui.

Laanui-Kalokuokamaile 

The male line of Kalokuokamaile became extinct when Kalokuokamaile did not produce a male heir.  He was survived by his daughter Kaohelelani, by his wife Kaloiokalani of Kahikinui and Honuaula descent. Kaohelelani married Nuhi, who was a ruling chief of Waimea, Hawaii. Rather than being called the House of Nuhi, the House continued under the name of their son, Gideon Peleioholani Laanui.  Gideon's male line came to end in 1944 after the death of Theresa Owana Laanui, the last female descendants.  

Her descendants:
 For daughters, Eva and Daisy,  (Cartwright-Laanui-Kalokuokamaile).
 For grandchildren, Elliot, Dwight, and Emily (Styne-Cartwright-Laanui-Kalokuokamaile).
 For son, Robert, from whom descend many other branches.   (Wilcox-Laanui-Kalokuokamaile).
 For the most active branch of Robert's descendants under Noa and his mother, Owana (Wilcox-Laanui-Kalokuokamaile-DeGuair-Salazar).
 For daughter, Virginia (Wilcox-Laanui-Kalokuokamaile). For Virginia's descendants (Miller-Wilcox-Laanui-Kalokuokamaile).

Claims to the throne

The Laanui are the descendants of the brother of Elizabeth Kekaʻaniau, who attended the Chiefs' Children's School. Each of the 15 royal children was declared eligible to succeed to the Hawaiian throne by King Kamehameha III with approval of the House of Nobles. Elizabeth was preemptive to the throne and was the last survivor of the Hawaiian nobility who officially could become a ruler, outliving all other royals. Elizabeth and her brother had the distinction of being the seniority line of the royal house of Keoua nui.  In 1920, Elizabeth claims her niece Theresa Owana Kaʻohelelani Laʻanui will succeed as the head of the royal house and then her descendants will follow by their primogeniture rights. The Laʻanui descendants never relinquished their royal claims, and continue to protest, inserting titles of nobility, creating orders of knighthood, satisfying the prevention of prescription under international law to protect sovereignty and their royal rights.

Elizabeth Kekaʻaniau also protested to the United States to protect the crown lands from annexation.  Her claim was that the crown lands were the private lands of Kamehameha III in trust for the person who sits on the throne.  Without the seat of the monarch, the crown lands should be inherited by the primogeniture family of Kamehameha III instead of transferring the lands to the United States and that her rights should not be ignored as she is a legitimate claimant to the crown lands.

Members of the Laanui family are often referred to with the titles of prince and princess.

Members of the family

References

External links 
 
 
 
 

House of Kalokuokamaile